Inken Wienefeld (born 24 February 1992) is a German female badminton player. In 2011, she won bronze medal at the European Junior Badminton Championships in girls' doubles event with Isabel Herttrich.

Achievements

European Junior Badminton Championships
Girls' Doubles

BWF International Challenge/Series
Women's Doubles

 BWF International Challenge tournament
 BWF International Series tournament
 BWF Future Series tournament

References

External links
 

1992 births
Living people
Sportspeople from Hamburg
German female badminton players